Vodianske is an urban-type settlement in the Pokrovsk Raion, Donetsk Oblast (province) of eastern Ukraine.  The population is

References

Urban-type settlements in Pokrovsk Raion